Antwaine Jermaine Wiggins (born December 23, 1988) is an American professional basketball player for Al Naft. He is a multi-position player. His extreme athleticism, versatility and length allows him to play shooting guard, small forward or power forward.  After four successful years at Charleston, Wiggins entered the 2012 NBA draft but was not selected in the draft's two rounds.

High school career
Wiggins played high school basketball at Greeneville High School, in Greeneville, Tennessee.

College career 
Wiggins played four seasons at Charleston, his senior year averaging 15.9 points, 6.5 rebounds, 2.2 assists and 1.1 steals per game.

NCAA Awards and Honors

Best Perimeter Defenders In Nation by CBSSports.com (2012)

Second-team All-SoCon (2012)

All-SoCon Team (Coaches) (2012)

All-SoCon Team (Media) (2012)

Professional career
2012–2014 After going undrafted in the 2012 NBA draft, Wiggins joined the top league team of Palmeiras in São Paulo, Brazil. He started for the team for 2 years until 2014.

2015–2016 On August 31, 2015, Wiggins joined Platense in Buenos Aires, Argentina. Wiggins helped lead the team into the quarterfinals of the playoffs. Wiggins was on TNA's (Torneo Nacional Ascenso Argentina), Top 10 list for both scorers and rebounds. Wiggins averaged 17.9 ppg, 8.1 rebounds, 1.1 assists and 1 block per game.

2016–2017 The following season, Wiggins was selected from the Raptors 905 in the 2nd round,  the 43rd overall pick in the 2016 NBA Development League Draft under coach and former NBA All-Star Jerry Stackhouse.  With the Raptors, he won the NBA D-League championship. In Toronto he only averaged 18.7 minutes but maintained a decent average of 8.7 ppg.

2017–2018 On July 20, 2017, Wiggins joined Lavrio of the Greek Basket League. He was invited to the 2018 Greek All-Star Game where he performed in the dunk contest. He finished his first regular season in the Greek league with 11 points, 5 rebounds. In playoffs he had a very successful series averaging 21 points, 9.5 rebounds, 3 blocks, and 2.5 assists.

2018–2019 On August 11, 2018, Wiggins signed with another Greek team, Ifaistos Limnou and remained in the Greek Basket League.

2019–2020 On August 30, 2019, Wiggins signed with his third Greek club, PAOK Thessaloniki. On January 23, 2020, the two sides amicably parted ways.

Personal life 
Antwaine Wiggins is related to former NBA and overseas basketball player Mitchell Wiggins. Mitchell Wiggins is the father of current NBA star Andrew Wiggins, current overseas basketball player Nick Wiggins and former overseas basketball player Mitchell Wiggins Jr. Antwaine is cousins with Andrew, Nick and Mitch Jr.

References

External links
Antwaine Wiggins at eurobasket.com
Antwaine Wiggins at espn.com
Antwaine Wiggins at basketball-reference.com
College of Charleston bio

1988 births
Living people
American expatriate basketball people in Argentina
American expatriate basketball people in Brazil
American expatriate basketball people in Canada
American expatriate basketball people in Greece
American men's basketball players
Basketball players from Tennessee
College of Charleston Cougars men's basketball players
Ifaistos Limnou B.C. players
Lavrio B.C. players
P.A.O.K. BC players
People from Kinston, North Carolina
Raptors 905 players
Small forwards
Al-Naft SC basketball players